The Journal of Law & Politics is a quarterly law review that was established in 1983 by students at the University of Virginia School of Law under the guidance of then Circuit Judge Antonin Scalia. It publishes articles, essays, book reviews, and commentaries focusing on issues at the cross-roads of law and politics: the role of the judiciary in making law, the relationship of the three branches of government, federalism, the politics of the judicial appointment process, voting rights, campaign finance, redistricting, voter initiatives, ethics investigations, the politics of education, and religious freedom in a pluralist society. The journal organizes regular symposiums and debates.

External links

References

American law journals
University of Virginia School of Law
Publications established in 1983
Law journals edited by students
English-language journals
1983 establishments in Virginia
Quarterly journals
Law and public policy journals